Egypt is an unincorporated community in Jefferson County, West Virginia, United States. It is located between Opequon Creek and Leetown off Sulphur Spring Road on Egypt Road.

References

Unincorporated communities in Jefferson County, West Virginia
Unincorporated communities in West Virginia